The  Party for Democracy and Reconciliation (PADER) is a small political party in Burundi founded in 2002.

Political parties in Burundi